Starr House, also known as the Michael VanKirk House, is a historic home located at Wilmington, New Castle County, Delaware. It was built between 1801 and 1806, and is -story, brick dwelling with a gable roof. The house was restored in 1946 and considered the last example of colonial architecture in the city of Wilmington. Adjacent to the house is a mid-19th century frame summer kitchen, which contains a beehive oven, has been encased in brick.

It was added to the National Register of Historic Places in 1970. It is located in the East Brandywine Historic District.

Situated on a two-block section of King Street known historically as Wilmington's "Lawyers Row," Starr House is one of a complex of six buildings that serve as the offices of Prickett, Jones & Elliott, P.A., one of Delaware's oldest law firms.

References

External links
 

Houses on the National Register of Historic Places in Delaware
Houses completed in 1806
Houses in Wilmington, Delaware
Historic American Buildings Survey in Delaware
National Register of Historic Places in Wilmington, Delaware
Individually listed contributing properties to historic districts on the National Register in Delaware